Cosmopolitan Television is a television network brand that targets a young female demographic consisting of acquired scripted television series, films, lifestyle series and more. The network's name is licensed from the Hearst Communications magazine title Cosmopolitan. Cosmopolitan Television consists of three local cable and satellite channels worldwide:

 Cosmopolitan TV (Canada) (33%)
 Cosmopolitan TV (Latin America)
 Cosmopolitan TV (Spain)

Hearst Television